The Mania River is a river in Madagascar that flows from the central mountains of the island, emptying into the Mozambique Channel.  The region of Amoron'i Mania is named from this river.

Main affluents from the left are the Ivato, Imorona, Ikoly, Menala, and Sakeny rivers, and on its right the Fitanamaria, Sakorendrika, Manandona river, Isakely and Iandratsay rivers.

There is an ongoing project of a hydroelectric power station on the Mania River, near the site of Antetezambato

References

External links

Rivers of Madagascar
Rivers of Vakinankaratra
Rivers of Amoron'i Mania
Rivers of Menabe
Tsiribihina River